The 2020–21 Oklahoma State Cowgirls basketball team represented Oklahoma State University in the 2020–21 NCAA Division I women's basketball season. The Cowgirls, led by tenth year head coach Jim Littell, played their home games at Gallagher-Iba Arena and were members of the Big 12 Conference.

They finished the season 19–9, 13–5 in Big 12 play to finish in a tie for second place. As the third seed in the Big 12 Tournament the defeated Oklahoma in the Quarterfinals before losing to West Virginia in the Semifinals.  They received an at-large bid to the NCAA women's basketball tournament.  As the eight seed in the Alamo Regional, the defeated Wake Forest in the First Round before losing to eventual champions Stanford in the Second Round.

Previous season

The Cowgirls finished the season 15–15, 6–12 in Big 12 play to finish in eighth place. The Big 12 Tournament, NCAA women's basketball tournament and WNIT were all cancelled before they began due to the COVID-19 pandemic.

Roster

Schedule and results

Source:

|-
!colspan=6 style=|Regular season

|-
!colspan=6 style=| Big 12 Women's Tournament

|-
!colspan=6 style=| NCAA tournament

Rankings
2020–21 NCAA Division I women's basketball rankings

The Coaches Poll did not release a Week 2 poll and the AP Poll did not release a poll after the NCAA Tournament.

See also
 2020–21 Oklahoma State Cowboys basketball team

References

2020-21
2020–21 Big 12 Conference women's basketball season
2020 in sports in Oklahoma
2021 in sports in Oklahoma